Pacific Palms is small coastal locality in the Mid North Coast region of New South Wales (NSW), Australia, in the Mid-Coast Council local government area.

The locality is bounded by Smiths Lake to the south and Booti Booti National Park to the north. It includes the villages of Charlotte Bay, Smiths Lake, Blueys Beach, Elizabeth Beach, Boomerang Beach and Tiona. In 2006 the population was 673.

Pacific Palms' major industry is tourism, with the locality attracting thousands of visitors every year. It is home to Booti Booti National Park.

A major attraction for visitors is the Green Cathedral at the north end of Pacific Palms. This outdoor cathedral is in a cabbage tree forest overlooking Wallis Lake. Blueys and Boomerang Beach are known for their beauty and surfing. Hiking trails and secluded beaches are also some of the attractions of the area.

References 

Towns in the Hunter Region
Suburbs of Mid-Coast Council
Coastal towns in New South Wales